Dyer Point is an ice-covered point just west of Hughes Peninsula on the north coast of Thurston Island. It was first plotted from air photos taken by U.S. Navy Operation Highjump in December 1946, and was named by the Advisory Committee on Antarctic Names for J.N. Dyer, a radio engineer with the Byrd Antarctic Expedition in 1933–35.

Maps
 Thurston Island – Jones Mountains. 1:500000 Antarctica Sketch Map. US Geological Survey, 1967.
 Antarctic Digital Database (ADD). Scale 1:250000 topographic map of Antarctica. Scientific Committee on Antarctic Research (SCAR). Since 1993, regularly upgraded and updated.

References 

Headlands of Ellsworth Land